The Polo Lounge is located inside the Beverly Hills Hotel at 9641 Sunset Boulevard, Beverly Hills, California.

Description
The lounge has been described as "done up in peachy pink (as you might expect), with deep carpets and dark green booths, each booth featuring a plug-in phone. Legend has it that Mia Farrow (and maybe even Marlene Dietrich) was banned from the Polo Lounge for wearing pants."

Hernando Courtright, who ran The Beverly Hills Hotel in the '30s and '40s, had a friend named Charles Wrightsman, who led a national champion polo team.  Wrightsman felt it unseemly to keep the team trophy, a silver bowl, in his own home.  Courtright, on hearing his friend's dilemma, offered to display the bowl in the hotel's bar, which was being redecorated at the time.  The name for the bar and its lounge sprang from that favor.

The Polo Lounge was seen as the premier power dining spot in all of Los Angeles. There are three dining areas complete with the signature pink and green motif.  The photograph behind the bar depicts Will Rogers and Darryl F. Zanuck, two lounge regulars, playing polo.  The menu "still offers a classic Neil McCarthy salad, named after the polo-playing millionaire."

Historical impact
Both the lounge and the hotel play a small yet significant role in the history of the Watergate political affair in 1972.  The high command of the Committee to Re-Elect the President (Richard Nixon) in 1972 was staying at the hotel during a West Coast fundraising trip, and having a breakfast meeting in the Polo Lounge when Watergate burglar G. Gordon Liddy placed his fateful call to Committee Deputy Director, Jeb Stuart Magruder. Magruder took the call at his table in the Lounge, and when Liddy realized that Magruder was obviously in a public setting he initially insisted that he (Magruder) travel to an Air Force base in Los Angeles to reach a private setting and a secure telephone line.

In the event, McGruder merely left the lounge and went to one of the hotel’s pay phone stations and called Liddy back.  Once fully briefed, Magruder went to one of the hotel’s famous suites and participated in a meeting with Committee Director and U.S. Attorney General John Mitchell, his special assistant Fred LaRue, and Committee Deputy Robert Mardian.

The hotel’s logged and charged long-distance-call records of the calls made from that suite, on the morning after the burglary, formed the basis of the evidence which convicted each of the participants of conspiracy and obstruction of justice in January 1975.

Movies filmed at the Polo Lounge
The Bad and the Beautiful (1952)
The Harder They Fall (1956)
Designing Woman (1957)
The Way We Were (1973)
Shampoo (1975)
California Suite (1978)
American Gigolo (1980)
Hannah and Her Sisters (1986)
Beverly Hills Cop II (1987)
B*A*P*S (1997)
Fear and Loathing in Las Vegas (1998)
Anywhere but Here (1999)
The Kid Stays in the Picture (2002)
Rules Don't Apply (2016)

References

External links
The Beverly Hills Hotel
Polo Lounge Web Page

Beverly Hills, California
Restaurants in Greater Los Angeles
Restaurants established in 1941
1941 establishments in California